The Hoh Brisen is a mountain of the Urner Alps, located on the border between the cantons of Nidwalden and Uri, in Central Switzerland. With an altitude of 2,413 metres above sea level, the Hoh Brisen is the highest summit of the subrange north of the Sinsgäuer Schonegg pass (1,915 m).

References

External links
 Hoh Brisen on Hikr

Mountains of Switzerland
Mountains of the Alps
Mountains of the canton of Uri
Mountains of Nidwalden
Nidwalden–Uri border
Two-thousanders of Switzerland